NPAC may stand for:

 News Photographers Association of Canada
National Pain Advocacy Center 
 Nocturnal post absorptive catabolism
 Northeast Parallel Architecture Center, Syracuse University
 North Point Alliance Church, Hong Kong
 Number Portability Administration Center, telecoms